The plastid (Greek: πλαστός; plastós: formed, molded – plural plastids) is a membrane-bound organelle found in the cells of plants, algae, and some other eukaryotic organisms. They are considered to be intracellular endosymbiotic cyanobacteria. Examples include chloroplasts (used for photosynthesis), chromoplasts (used for pigment synthesis and storage), and leucoplasts (non-pigmented plastids that can sometimes differentiate).

The event which led to permanent endosymbiosis in the Archaeplastida clade (of land plants, red algae, and green algae) probably occurred with a cyanobiont (a symbiotic cyanobacteria) related to the genus Gloeomargarita, around 1.5 billion years ago. A later primary endosymbiosis event occurred in photosynthetic Paulinella amoeboids about 90–140 million years ago. This plastid belongs to the "PS-clade" (of the cyanobacteria genera Prochlorococcus and Synechococcus). Secondary and tertiary endosymbiosis has also occurred, in a wide variety of organisms; additionally, some organisms sequester ingested plastids in a process that is known as kleptoplasty.

A. F. W. Schimper was the first to name and provide a clear definition of plastids. They often contain pigments used in photosynthesis, and the types of pigments in a plastid determine the cell's color. They are also the site of manufacture and storage of important chemical compounds used by the cells of autotrophic eukaryotes. They possess a double-stranded DNA molecule that is circular, like that of the circular chromosome of prokaryotic cells. Even in organisms where the plastids have lost their photosynthetic properties, the plastid is kept because of its essential role in the production of molecules like the isoprenoids.

In land plants 

In land plants, plastids that contain chlorophyll can carry out photosynthesis and are called chloroplasts. Plastids can also store products like starch and can synthesize fatty acids and terpenes, which can be used for producing energy and as raw material for the synthesis of other molecules. For example, the components of the plant cuticle and its epicuticular wax are synthesized by the epidermal cells from palmitic acid, which is synthesized in the chloroplasts of the mesophyll tissue. All plastids are derived from proplastids, which are present in the meristematic regions of the plant. Proplastids and young chloroplasts commonly divide by binary fission, but more mature chloroplasts also have this capacity.

Plant proplastids (undifferentiated plastids) may differentiate into several forms, depending upon which function they perform in the cell. They may develop into any of the following variants:
 Chloroplasts: typically green plastids used for photosynthesis. 
 Etioplasts are the precursors of chloroplasts
 Chromoplasts: coloured plastids for pigment synthesis and storage
 Gerontoplasts: control the dismantling of the photosynthetic apparatus during plant senescence
 Leucoplasts: colourless plastids for monoterpene synthesis; leucoplasts sometimes differentiate into more specialized plastids:
 Amyloplasts: for starch storage and detecting gravity (for geotropism)
 Elaioplasts: for storing fat
 Proteinoplasts: for storing and modifying protein
 Tannosomes: for synthesizing and producing tannins and polyphenols

Depending on their morphology and function, plastids have the ability to differentiate, or redifferentiate, between these and other forms.

Each plastid creates multiple copies of a circular 10–250 kilobase plastome. The number of genome copies per plastid is variable, ranging from more than 1000 in rapidly dividing cells, which, in general, contain few plastids, to 100 or fewer in mature cells, where plastid divisions have given rise to a large number of plastids. The plastome contains about 100 genes encoding ribosomal and transfer ribonucleic acids (rRNAs and tRNAs) as well as proteins involved in photosynthesis and plastid gene transcription and translation. However, these proteins only represent a small fraction of the total protein set-up necessary to build and maintain the structure and function of a particular type of plastid. Plant nuclear genes encode the vast majority of plastid proteins, and the expression of plastid genes and nuclear genes is tightly co-regulated to coordinate proper development of plastids in relation to cell differentiation.

Plastid DNA exists as large protein-DNA complexes associated with the inner envelope membrane and called 'plastid nucleoids'. Each nucleoid particle may contain more than 10 copies of the plastid DNA. The proplastid contains a single nucleoid located in the centre of the plastid. The developing plastid has many nucleoids, localized at the periphery of the plastid, bound to the inner envelope membrane. During the development of proplastids to chloroplasts, and when plastids convert from one type to another, nucleoids change in morphology, size and location within the organelle. The remodelling of nucleoids is believed to occur by modifications to the composition and abundance of nucleoid proteins.

Many plastids, particularly those responsible for photosynthesis, possess numerous internal membrane layers.

In plant cells, long thin protuberances called stromules sometimes form and extend from the main plastid body into the cytosol and interconnect several plastids. Proteins, and presumably smaller molecules, can move within stromules. Most cultured cells that are relatively large compared to other plant cells have very long and abundant stromules that extend to the cell periphery.

In 2014, evidence of possible plastid genome loss was found in Rafflesia lagascae, a non-photosynthetic parasitic flowering plant, and in Polytomella, a genus of non-photosynthetic green algae. Extensive searches for plastid genes in both Rafflesia and Polytomella yielded no results, however the conclusion that their plastomes are entirely missing is still controversial. Some scientists argue that plastid genome loss is unlikely since even non-photosynthetic plastids contain genes necessary to complete various biosynthetic pathways, such as heme biosynthesis.

In spite of the loss of the plastid genome in the Rafflesiaceae, the plastids still occur as "shells" without DNA content. This looks suggestively reminiscent of hydrogenosomes in various organisms.

In algae and protists
Plastid types in algae and protists include:

 Chloroplasts: found in the green algae (plants) and other organisms who derived their ones from the green algae.
 Muroplasts: also known as cyanoplasts or cyanelles, the plastids of glaucophyte algae are similar to plant chloroplasts, except that they have a peptidoglycan cell wall that is similar to that of prokaryote.
 Rhodoplasts: the red plastids found in red algae, that allow them to photosynthesize to a depth of up to 268 m. The chloroplasts of plants differ from the rhodoplasts in their ability to synthesize starch, which is stored in the form of granules within the plastids. In red algae, floridean starch is synthesized and stored outside the plastids in the cytosol.
 Secondary and tertiary plastids: from endosymbiosis of green algae and red algae.
 Leucoplast: in algae, the term  is used for all unpigmented plastids. Their function differs from the leucoplasts of plants.
 Apicoplast: the non-photosynthetic plastids of Apicomplexa derived from secondary endosymbiosis.

The plastid of photosynthetic Paulinella species is often referred to as the 'cyanelle' or chromatophore, and is used in photosynthesis; it had a much more recent endosymbiotic event about 90–140 million years ago, and is the only other known primary endosymbiosis event of cyanobacteria.

Etioplasts, amyloplasts and chromoplasts are plant-specific and do not occur in algae. Plastids in algae and hornworts may also differ from plant plastids in that they contain pyrenoids.

Inheritance
Most plants inherit the plastids from only one parent. In general, angiosperms inherit plastids from the female gamete, whereas many gymnosperms inherit plastids from the male pollen. Algae also inherit plastids from only one parent. The plastid DNA of the other parent is, thus, completely lost.

In normal intraspecific crossings (resulting in normal hybrids of one species), the inheritance of plastid DNA appears to be quite strictly 100% uniparental. In interspecific hybridisations, however, the inheritance of plastids appears to be more erratic. Although plastids inherit mainly maternally in interspecific hybridisations, there are many reports of hybrids of flowering plants that contain plastids of the father.
Approximately 20% of angiosperms, including alfalfa (Medicago sativa), normally show biparental inheritance of plastids.

DNA damage and repair

Plastid DNA of maize seedlings is subject to increased damage as the seedlings develop.  The DNA is damaged in oxidative environments created by photo-oxidative reactions and photosynthetic/respiratory electron transfer.  Some DNA molecules are repaired while DNA with unrepaired damage appears to be degraded to non-functional fragments.

DNA repair proteins are encoded by the cell's nuclear genome but can be translocated to plastids where they maintain genome stability/integrity by repairing the plastid's DNA.  As an example, in chloroplasts of the moss Physcomitrella patens, a protein employed in DNA mismatch repair (Msh1) interacts with proteins employed in recombinational repair (RecA and RecG) to maintain plastid genome stability.

Origin
Plastids are thought to be endosymbiotic cyanobacteria.  The primary endosymbiotic event of the Archaeplastida is hypothesized to have occurred around 1.5 billion years ago and enabled eukaryotes to carry out oxygenic photosynthesis. Three evolutionary lineages in the Archaeplastida have since emerged in which the plastids are named differently: chloroplasts in green algae and/or plants, rhodoplasts in red algae, and muroplasts in the glaucophytes. The plastids differ both in their pigmentation and in their ultrastructure. For example, chloroplasts in plants and green algae have lost all phycobilisomes, the light harvesting complexes found in cyanobacteria, red algae and glaucophytes, but instead contain stroma and grana thylakoids. The glaucocystophycean plastid—in contrast to chloroplasts and rhodoplasts—is still surrounded by the remains of the cyanobacterial cell wall. All these primary plastids are surrounded by two membranes.

The plastid of photosynthetic Paulinella species is often referred to as the 'cyanelle' or chromatophore, and had a much more recent endosymbiotic event about 90–140 million years ago; it is the only known primary endosymbiosis event of cyanobacteria outside of the Archaeplastida. The plastid belongs to the "PS-clade" (of the cyanobacteria genera Prochlorococcus and Synechococcus), which is a different sister clade to the plastids belonging to the Archaeplastida.

In contrast to primary plastids derived from primary endosymbiosis of a prokaryoctyic cyanobacteria, complex plastids originated by secondary endosymbiosis in which a  eukaryotic organism engulfed another eukaryotic organism that contained a primary plastid. When a eukaryote engulfs a red or a green alga and retains the algal plastid, that plastid is typically surrounded by more than two membranes. In some cases these plastids may be reduced in their metabolic and/or photosynthetic capacity.  Algae with complex plastids derived by secondary endosymbiosis of a red alga include the heterokonts, haptophytes, cryptomonads, and most dinoflagellates (= rhodoplasts). Those that endosymbiosed a green alga include the euglenids and chlorarachniophytes (= chloroplasts). The Apicomplexa, a phylum of obligate parasitic protozoa including the causative agents of malaria (Plasmodium spp.), toxoplasmosis (Toxoplasma gondii), and many other human or animal diseases also harbor a complex plastid (although this organelle has been lost in some apicomplexans, such as Cryptosporidium parvum, which causes cryptosporidiosis).  The 'apicoplast' is no longer capable of photosynthesis, but is an essential organelle, and a promising target for antiparasitic drug development.

Some dinoflagellates and sea slugs, in particular of the genus Elysia, take up algae as food and keep the plastid of the digested alga to profit from the photosynthesis; after a while, the plastids are also digested. This process is known as kleptoplasty, from the Greek, kleptes, thief.

Plastid development cycle 

In 1977 J.M Whatley proposed a plastid development cycle which said that plastid development is not always unidirectional but is instead a complicated cyclic process. Proplastids are the precursor of the more differentiated forms of plastids, as shown in the diagram to the right.

See also

Notes

References

Further reading

External links 
Transplastomic plants for biocontainment (biological confinement of transgenes) — Co-extra research project on coexistence and traceability of GM and non-GM supply chains
 Tree of Life Eukaryotes

Organelles
Plant physiology
Photosynthesis
Endosymbiotic events